Michael Voudouris (born March 26, 1960) is an American-born Greek skeleton racer.

Career
Competing in the early 2000s, he finished 23rd in the men's skeleton event at the 2002 Winter Olympics in Salt Lake City.

Voudouris also is a photojournalist and an emergency medical technician. During the September 11, 2001 attacks in New York City, he served as a public safety official for which he earned the AHEPA Medal of Freedom the following year.

In 2005, Voudouris took part in the Rolex Transatlantic Sailboat Race from New York City to England.

References
2002 men's skeleton results
2005 Rolex Transatlantic race featuring Voudouris
Athens (Greece) Environmental Foundation Board of Directors
Canoe.ca profile of Voudouris for the 2002 Winter Olympics
FIBT profile
Skeletonsport.com profile

1960 births
American male sailors (sport)
American male skeleton racers
American people of Greek descent
Greek male sailors (sport)
Greek male skeleton racers
Living people
Skeleton racers at the 2002 Winter Olympics
Olympic skeleton racers of Greece
Sportspeople from New York City